(also known as Monster Hunter 2) is an action role-playing video game developed and published by Capcom for the PlayStation 2. The second main installment of the Monster Hunter franchise, it was released in Japan in February 2006. The game features additions such as a day-night cycle, inclusion of seasons, monsters and weapon types that would eventually become mainstays such as the Long Sword and Hunting Horn.

Gameplay
Monster Hunter 2s gameplay follows closely with the preceding games as well as introducing several additions. The player's character can embark on quests involving hunting large or small monsters and gathering; the rewards gained from completing quests are used to forge weapons and armor.

Monster Hunter 2 has an improved weapon tree and upgradeable armors. As in all Monster Hunter games, armor pieces can be worn to obtain skills and abilities. A new feature in Monster Hunter 2 is the use of gems. Gems add skill points to complement those added by armor and weapons. Gems are created by combining ore and/or monster parts. Gems can be attached and detached from armor and weapons that have special gem slots.

Reception
Monster Hunter 2 received generally positive reviews from Japan-based Famitsu magazine receiving a score of 37/40 from the publication.

Related games
Monster Hunter Freedom 2, released in Japan as Monster Hunter Portable 2nd, is a partial port of Monster Hunter 2 for the PSP. Monster Hunter Freedom 2 adds features and includes several changes to the original game.

Notes

References

Role-playing video games
Action role-playing video games
Japan-exclusive video games
Monster Hunter
PlayStation 2 games
PlayStation 2-only games
Video game sequels
Video games featuring protagonists of selectable gender
2006 video games
Video games developed in Japan
Video games scored by Akihiko Narita